Sérgio Ribeiro may refer to:

 Sérgio Ribeiro (politician), Portuguese politician
 Sérgio Pinto Ribeiro (born 1959), Brazilian swimmer
 Sérgio Ribeiro (cyclist) (born 1980), Portuguese cyclist
 Sérginho Ribeiro (born 1985), Portuguese footballer
 Sérgio Ribeiro (footballer, born 1996), Portuguese footballer
 Sérgio Ribeiro (tennis), Brazilian tennis player